Mali Lug   is a village in Croatia. It is connected by the D32 highway.

Populated places in Primorje-Gorski Kotar County